MIAB may refer to:

 Magnetically Impelled Arc Butt, a type of welding process
 Member of the International Association of Book-keepers
 Message in a bottle, a form of communication whereby a message is sealed in a container and released into a body of water
 mind.in.a.box, an Austrian electronic music band
 Music Industry Association of Belize, an organization formed by Ivan Duran

See also
 Meyab
 Miab, East Azerbaijan